The Sunset Grill is a restaurant at 7439 Sunset Boulevard in Los Angeles, California. The burger joint neighbors the Rock Walk at the Guitar Center and gained fame from the Don Henley song "Sunset Grill".

The original Sunset Grill was run by owner Joe Froehlich from 1957 to 1997 when he sold the business. The building was torn down, rebuilt and reopened.

References

Restaurants in Los Angeles
Restaurants in West Hollywood, California
Restaurants established in 1957